Thomas Battistella (born 29 July 2001) is an Italian professional footballer who plays as a midfielder for  club Modena.

Club career
On 28 July 2022, Battistella signed a four-year contract with Modena.

References

External links

2001 births
Living people
People from Pordenone
Italian footballers
Association football midfielders
Serie C players
Udinese Calcio players
Carrarese Calcio players
Modena F.C. 2018 players
Footballers from Friuli Venezia Giulia